

Qualification format
A total of six weight classes will be held at the 2022 World Games in kickboxing. In each weight there will be eight competitors.

Qualification summary
The following table summarises the outcome of qualification for the kickboxing tournament at the 2022 World Games. 29 nations gained at least one quota place for Birmingham.

Men's events

−63.5 kg

−75 kg

+91 kg

Women's events

−52 kg

−60 kg

-70 kg

References